Abner Clough (13 September 1840–22 April 1910) was a New Zealand farm worker and character. He was born in Akaroa, North Canterbury, New Zealand on 13 September 1840. Abner stood at a height of 6'4" and weighed some sixteen stone; his black hair and beard, swarthy complexion, beetling eyebrows, erect bearing giving him a leonine and commanding appearance. One of his contemporaries once said, 'Abner does not usually walk but goes at a slow jog; none has ever been able to keep up with him in N.Z. yet". There is a mountain top in New Zealand called Abner's Head ~ it was his look out point when searching for stray cattle.

References

1840 births
1910 deaths
New Zealand farmers
People from Akaroa
Ngāi Tahu people